Sülün is a town (belde) and municipality in the Afyonkarahisar District, Afyonkarahisar Province, Turkey. Its population is 2,939 (2021). It was the site of the ancient city of Prymnessos.

References

Populated places in Afyonkarahisar District
Towns in Turkey